Gesturi, Gèsturi in the Sardinian language, is a comune (municipality) in the Province of South Sardinia in the Italian region Sardinia, located about  north of Cagliari and about  northeast of Sanluri in the Marmilla area.

Gesturi borders the following municipalities: Barumini, Genoni, Gergei, Isili, Nuragus, Setzu, Tuili.

References

External links

Gesturi Coat of Arms

Cities and towns in Sardinia